"Voice of the people" generally means the opinion of the majority of the people.

Voice of the people, People's Voice or variants of the two may also refer to:

Political parties 
 Voice of the People (Algeria)
 Voice of the Nation (Armenia)
 Voice of the People Party (Meghalaya), a political party in Meghalaya, India
 Voice of the People Party, in Namibia
 Voice of the People of Tunisia
 People's Voice (Bulgaria)
 Voice of the Nation, or People's Voice, in Iran
 Peoples Voice (Singapore)
 People's Voice (Scottish pro-independence group)
 People's Voice Party, in Turkey
 People's Voice Party (Trinidad and Tobago)
 Blaenau Gwent People's Voice, in Wales
 Sauti ya Umma, in Tanzania

Other uses 
 The Voice of the People, an anthology of folk songs
 Voice of the People (website), a South Korean online newspaper
 People's Voice (newspaper), a Canadian newspaper 
 Voice, formerly People's Voice, a newspaper of the Australian Labor Party (Tasmanian Branch)
 The People's Voice, an Israeli–Palestinian peace initiative
 The People's Voice (internet TV station)
 Radio Voice of the People, a radio station in Zimbabwe
 Zëri i Popullit, a newspaper in Albania
 The People's Voice (newspaper), a newspaper published in New York City that was focused on racial issues
 Minsheng (Voice of the People), formerly Huiminglu, a Chinese anarchist magazine founded in the 1910s

See also 
 
 
 Vox populi (disambiguation)
 Vox humana (disambiguation)
 People's Advocate (disambiguation)